William Morris Jr. (1746 – 1802) was a pioneer, military officer, and politician born in Orange County, Colony of Virginia. He served as a member of the Virginia House of Delegates for Kanawha County from 1792 until 1801 as a member of the Federalist Party. Morris served in Lord Dunmore's War in the Battle of Point Pleasant in 1774. He was wounded during the battle. 

When the American Revolutionary War began in 1776, Morris was commissioned as a captain in the Virginia Militia where he served in the Kanawha Valley, and Greenbrier County supporting General Andrew Lewis as a spy until 1792. Captain Morris led a company of spies whose primary mission was to track hostile Indian movements who aligned with the Royalists, frontier defense, and engage in guerrilla operations. William served alongside his brother Leonard Morris, and brother-in-law John Jones between the years 1778 through 1783 who were also spies. 

In March 1783, Captain William Morris commissioned John Young as a lieutenant and assigned him as a spy. Lieutenant Young's principal role was to lead troops in surveilling, engaging, and reporting on Indian movements throughout the Greenbrier and Kanawha region. Captain Morris's unit garrison was at Morris Fort (also known as Kelly's Post) from 1784 until 1786. Captain Morris was promoted to major in 1786 where he served in the Northwest Indian Wars and Whiskey Rebellion.

In the October Session of 1794, Morris was appointed as a trustee of the newly incorporated town of Charleston (now the capital city of West Virginia) along with Ruben Slaughter, Andrew Donnally Sr, William Clendenin, John Morris (brother), Leonard Morris (brother), George Alderson, Abraham Baker, and John Young.

In 1801 Morris became Sheriff of Kanawha County, Virginia replacing Leonard Morris, who served as Sheriff of Kanawha from 1798. He died the following winter in 1802.

William Morris, Jr. is the eldest son of ten children by William Morris and Elizabeth Stapp (Stipps). William Morris Sr. was born in January 1722 and emigrated from London, England at the age of 14. William Morris's brothers all served as military officers in Lord Dunmore's War, American Revolution, and the Northern Indian Wars. William Morris Jr also had a son named William Morris III, who served in the Virginia House of Delegates representing Kanawha County from 1796-1809. William Morris Jr. is the uncle of US House Representative Calvary Morris, Calvary is the son of Captain John Morris.

References 

1746 births
1802 deaths
Members of the Virginia House of Delegates
Federalist Party politicians
Virginia militiamen in the American Revolution
People from Kanawha County, West Virginia
Virginia sheriffs
Trustees of populated places in Virginia